Marc Dugain (born 1957) is a French novelist and film director, best known for La Chambre des Officiers (English, The Officers' Ward) (1999), a novel set in World War I.

Dugain was born in Senegal and studied at the Institut d'études politiques de Grenoble. He worked in finance, created a financial engineering company and was also a teacher and lecturer in finance at Emlyon Business School.

His prize-winning first novel was made into a successful film in 2001.

Bibliography
 La Chambre des officiers, Éditions JC Lattès, 1999.
 Campagne anglaise, 2000.
 Heureux comme Dieu en France, 2002.
 La Malédiction d'Edgar, Gallimard, 2005.
 Une exécution ordinaire, Gallimard, 2007.
 En bas, les nuages, Flammarion, 2008.
 L'Insomnie des étoiles, Gallimard, 2010.
 Avenue des géants, Gallimard, 2012.
 L'Homme nu. La dictature invisible du numérique (avec Christophe Labbé), éditions Robert Laffont et Plon, 2016. 
 Transparence, Gallimard, 2019.
- LA VOLONTÉ, Gallimard, 2021

References

1957 births
Living people
Academic staff of Emlyon Business School
20th-century French novelists
21st-century French novelists
French film directors
French male screenwriters
French screenwriters
French comics writers
Prix des libraires winners
Roger Nimier Prize winners
Prix des Deux Magots winners
French male novelists
20th-century French male writers
21st-century French male writers